The  is an institution of the Ministry of Health, Labour and Welfare.

The Murayama Government Building and RIKEN Tsukuba Research Institute are biosafety level (BSL) 4 research facilities, but both facilities are operated up to BSL-3 due to opposition from local residents, and research that requires BSL-4 can be performed. On August 7, 2015, it was designated as the first BSL-4 facility in Japan for detailed examination and development of therapeutic agents for patients suspected of being infected with Ebola due to the 2014 West African Ebola epidemic.

References

Medical research institutes in Japan
Government agencies established in 1947
1947 establishments in Japan
Research institutes established in 1947